Aleksei Vladislavovich Mironov (born 1 January 2000) is a Russian football player who plays for FC Rostov.

Club career
He made his debut in the Russian Football National League for FC Orenburg on 16 August 2020 in a game against FC Tekstilshchik Ivanovo.

On 17 June 2022, Mironov signed a five-year contract with FC Rostov. He made his Russian Premier League debut for Rostov on 24 July 2022 against FC Lokomotiv Moscow.

Career statistics

References

External links
 
 Profile by Russian Football National League
 

2000 births
Footballers from Moscow
Living people
Russian footballers
Russia youth international footballers
Association football midfielders
FC Lokomotiv Moscow players
FC Orenburg players
FC Rostov players
Russian First League players
Russian Second League players
Russian Premier League players